Adam Heywood Fogerty (born 6 March 1969) is an English actor and former boxer and rugby league footballer. He is the son of rugby league footballer Terry Fogerty, who played in the 1960s and 1970s then coached in the 1980s.

Background
Fogerty was born in Halifax, West Riding of Yorkshire, England.
In the early 1980s the family moved to the Isle of Man with Fogerty attending Ballakermeen Junior High School and latterly Douglas High School. At the age of 15 years Fogerty became the youngest person to represent the Isle of Man on the rugby field.

Boxing
Fogerty's boxing career saw him facing a number of opponents. He twice faced Paul Lister, with their first meeting in 1989 handing Fogerty his first and only loss in a 6-round decision. He repaid the favour with an 8th-round knockout of Lister the next year.

Rugby league
After ending his boxing career, Fogerty joined Halifax. He also played for Warrington, and won a Super League medal with St. Helens. Fogerty is currently working with Toronto Wolfpack as assistant coach.

Beginning around the same time as his rugby league career, Fogerty began acting and has played supporting roles in several films such as Shooting Fish and Played, as well as the unlicensed boxer, Gorgeous George, in the Guy Ritchie crime caper Snatch. He played Mouse in Mean Machine and Raw in Greenfingers. He has also worked on soaps Coronation Street and Hollyoaks. In 2012 he joined Barrie Rutter's Northern Broadsides theatre company to play Costard in Shakespeare's Love's Labour's Lost.

Acting 
Since 1992 Fogerty has had numerous film and television roles. His television appearances include that of Ken Fairbrother, a rugby player turned wrestler in Yorkshire Television's drama series Heartbeat, whilst his most notable film part was as unlicensed boxer "Gorgeous George" in Guy Ritchie's film Snatch; in which he appeared alongside Brad Pitt.

In 2019, Fogerty was cast as an 'emergency plumber' for the British insurance company Direct Line. A television commercial starring Harvey Keitel.

Other ventures 
In 2020, Fogerty opened a fish and chips shop in Halifax, England.

Filmography

References

External links
Profile at saints.org.uk

The codfather! - FANCY fish and chips with star quality?

1969 births
Living people
20th-century English male actors
21st-century English male actors
Actors from Halifax, West Yorkshire
English male boxers
English male film actors
English male soap opera actors
English people of Irish descent
English rugby league players
Halifax R.L.F.C. players
Heavyweight boxers
Rugby league players from Halifax, West Yorkshire
Sportspeople from Halifax, West Yorkshire
St Helens R.F.C. players
Toronto Wolfpack coaches
Warrington Wolves players